Hiller Aircraft Company was founded in 1942 as Hiller Industries by Stanley Hiller to develop helicopters.

History
Stanley Hiller, then seventeen, established the first helicopter factory on the West Coast of the United States, located in Berkeley, California, in 1942, under the name "Hiller Industries,"  to develop his design for the coaxial-rotor XH-44 "Hiller-Copter" for the U.S. Army.  The XH-44 became operational in 1944. In collaboration with Henry J. Kaiser, it became United Helicopters in 1945.  In the postwar years, United Helicopter produced a number of innovative helicopter designs for military and civilian purposes, including coaxial-rotor and tailless designs, as well as more conventional models.  In  January, 1949, a Hiller 360 became the first civilian helicopter to cross the United States.

Besides helicopters, in the year after World War II, Stanley Hiller researched a two-man rocket-jet aircraft design that took off and landed vertically, called the VJ-100, in which he tried unsuccessfully to interest the U.S. military.

The company was renamed Hiller Helicopters in 1948.  It was involved in the development of a number of prototype helicopters. From the early 1960s to 1969, its Palo Alto plant served as a CIA cover for the production of the CORONA reconnaissance satellites.

Hiller was purchased by Fairchild Aircraft in 1964.

Jeff Hiller, the son of Stanley Hiller, repurchased the company in 1994 with the help of a dozen Thai investors led by Patrick C. Lim, part owner of Siam Steel and many other Asian ventures. For ownership of Hiller aircraft, these investors helped cover the company's liabilities about $1 million and commit about $10 million to build at least 30 new helicopters at the new East Bay production site and also setting up the first aerospace company in Thailand.

Stanley Hiller donated money and a number of aircraft to form the Hiller Aviation Museum in San Carlos, California, which opened in 1998.

In 2009, the Hiller (China) Aircraft Manufacturing Company  began construction of a production facility in Zhangjiakou City, northwest of Beijing. The company is a joint venture between Hiller Aircraft Corporation, Zhangjiakou Chahar General Aviation Company. At the time, Zhangjiakou Chahar General Aviation was already carrying out low-rate production of UH-12 parts and sub assemblies.

In July 2018 an accident in which a truck driver drove over his co-driver occurred at the Hiller Firebaugh facility. On May 4 a jury found Hiller 70% at fault for the accident and awarded the injured driver over 9 million dollars in damages. The company's website news update from February 15, 2021 indicates the company is struggling financially with the owners hesitating to provide further funding to keep the company operating.

Aircraft

References

External links

Hiller's home page
" Hiller Aircraft Ready To Takeoff"
 Hiller Helicopter Owners and Pilots Forum

Aircraft manufacturers of the United States
Helicopter manufacturers of the United States